Senate Page Program may refer to 
Canadian Senate Page Program
United States Senate Page